Wilton Center is an unincorporated community in southern Will County, Illinois, United States. It is located on flat land 10 miles northeast of Wilmington, 5 miles south of Manhattan, and 8 miles west of Peotone. It has a population of about 150.

Geography
U.S. Route 52 goes through Wilton Center. Other main roads are Cedar Rd., Peotone-Wilmington Rd., and Elevator Rd. Other roads in Wilton Center are Arsenal Rd. and Quigley Rd. Wilton Center is half surrounded by a forest preserve controlled by Will County.
There is a church on Rt. 52.

Education
Wilton Center is a part of Peotone School District 207-U. Wilton Center Elementary School was closed, after a 4–3 vote by the school board, upon the completion of the 2013–2014 school year.

Notable people
Richard J. Barr, Illinois State Senator, was born in Wilton Center.

Notes

External links
Maps and Satellite

Unincorporated communities in Will County, Illinois
Unincorporated communities in Illinois